Zoran "Lotke" Lalović (January 24, 1950 – May 3, 2015) was a Serbian musician, producer and singer of heavy metal band Kraljevski Apartman.

With Serbian musician Zoran Zdravković, in 1995 he decided to form a new band named Kraljevski Apartman. In 2014, he was diagnosed with kidney cancer, which quickly metastasized to the lungs. His last appearance was at the Republic Square in Belgrade on December 31, 2014. Lalović died on May 3, 2015 at 65.

References

1950 births
2015 deaths
Musicians from Belgrade
Serbian rock musicians
20th-century Serbian male singers